Crotalocephalina is an extinct genus of trilobite in the order Phacopida found in Morocco.

External links
Photo of a Crotocephalina
 Crotalocephalina at the Paleobiology Database

Devonian trilobites of Africa
Fossils of Morocco
Cheiruridae
Phacopida genera